Taiyuan Iron and Steel (Group) Co., Ltd. formerly  Taiyuan Iron & Steel Corporation (TISCO), also known as Taigang Group is a Chinese steel maker based in Taiyuan, Shanxi Province. The company was the parent of Taigang Stainless Steel Co., Ltd., a listed steel manufacturer and Linfen Iron and Steel, an unlisted steel manufacturer respectively. The unlisted portion of the group, also consisted of a real estate company and a hospital.

History
The predecessor of Taiyuan steel plant was founded in 1934, in the Warlord Era by Yan Xishan. In 1949 it was under control of the Communist Party of China during Chinese Civil War.

In 1996 it was incorporated as "Taiyuan Iron and Steel (Group) Co., Ltd.". In 1998, a subsidiary was incorporated and listed on Shenzhen Stock Exchange ("").

In 2006, Taigang Group injected most steel manufacturing assets to the publicly traded subsidiary, except , in Linfen, Shanxi and several subsidiaries.

Business divisions
Taiyuan Iron and Steel Group owned a hospital in Taiyuan, via a non wholly owned subsidiary. The group also involved in real estate development which developed a number of neighbourhoods in Taiyuan. Some of them were allocated to the staff of the group.

The group's flagship subsidiary, Taigang Stainless Steel had two joint ventures with Tianjin Pipe Corporation (TPCO): "Tianjin TISCO & TPCO Stainless Steel" in a 65–35 ratio (TPCO held the stake via a non wholly owned subsidiary), as well as "Tianjin TPCO & TISCO Welding Pipe" in a 50–50 ratio respectively.

Stainless steel CN¥0.1 coins were made by Taigang Stainless Steel.

Equity investments
Taiyuan Iron and Steel Group was the second largest shareholder of listed securities firm, Shanxi Securities, for 9.99% stake (2018 data). From 2014 to 2016 the group had disinvest part of the stake they owned.

Taiyuan Iron and Steel Group also owned 16.67% stake in China Niobium Investment Holdings, which the holding owned 15% stake of Companhia Brasileira de Metalurgia e Mineração.

Taiyuan Iron and Steel Group also owned 40% stake in CNMC Nickel, which owned a nickel mine in Myanmar.

Rankings
Taigang Stainless Steel was ranked the 1324th in 2019 Forbes Global 2000 list, a list for global top listed companies. , it was a constituent of SZSE 200 Index (mid cap index).

According to World Steel Association (Chinese companies data was provided by China Iron and Steel Association), the corporation was ranked the 39th in 2018 the world ranking by production volume, for 10.70 million metric tons.

References

External links
 
 Official website of Linfen Iron and Steel

Steel companies of China
Companies based in Taiyuan
Companies owned by the provincial government of China
1934 establishments in China
1996 establishments in China